Babotok  is a village in Croatia, located in the Kapela municipality in Bjelovar-Bilogora County.

Populated places in Bjelovar-Bilogora County